Syntaxin-1A is a protein that in humans is encoded by the STX1A gene.

Function 
Synaptic vesicles store neurotransmitters that are released during calcium-regulated exocytosis. The specificity of neurotransmitter release requires the localization of both synaptic vesicles and calcium channels to the presynaptic active zone. Syntaxins function in this vesicle fusion process.

Syntaxin-1A is a member of the syntaxin superfamily. Syntaxins are nervous system-specific proteins implicated in the docking of synaptic vesicles with the presynaptic plasma membrane. Syntaxins possess a single C-terminal transmembrane domain, a SNARE [Soluble NSF (N-ethylmaleimide-sensitive fusion protein)-Attachment protein REceptor] domain (known as H3), and an N-terminal regulatory domain (Habc). Syntaxins bind synaptotagmin in a calcium-dependent fashion and interact with voltage dependent calcium and potassium channels via the C-terminal H3 domain. Syntaxin-1A is a key protein in ion channel regulation and synaptic exocytosis.

Clinical significance 
Syntaxins serve as a substrate for botulinum neurotoxin type C, a metalloprotease that blocks exocytosis and has high affinity for a molecular complex that includes the alpha-latrotoxin receptor which produces explosive exocytosis.

The expression level of STX1A is directly correlated with intelligence in Williams syndrome.

Interactive pathway map

Interactions 

STX1A has been shown to interact with:

 CPLX1,
 CFTR,
 NAPA,
 RNF40,
 SCNN1G,
 SLC6A1,
 SNAP-25,
 SNAP23,
 STXBP1,
 STXBP5,
 SYT1
 UNC13B,
 VAMP2, and
 VAMP8.

See also 
 Syntaxin

References

Further reading

External links